Ovar ( or ) is a city and a municipality in Aveiro District, Baixo Vouga Subregion in Portugal. The population in 2011 was 55,398, in an area of 147.70 km2. It had 42,582 eligible voters (2006). The municipality includes two cities: Ovar (16,849 inhabitants in 2001) and Esmoriz (11,020 inhabitants in 2001).

The present Mayor is Salvador Malheiro, elected by the Portuguese Social Democratic Party. The municipal holiday is July 25.

Ovar is home to the football team A.D. Ovarense who play at the Estádio Marques da Silva. The main beach area is Furadouro, and Ovar is located in the northern point of the Ria de Aveiro (Aveiro Lagoon)

Demographics

Cities and towns
There are two cities and three towns in the municipality.
 Esmoriz (city)
 Ovar (city)
 Cortegaça (town)
 São João (town)
 Válega (town)

Parishes 

Administratively, the municipality is divided into 5 civil parishes (freguesias):
 Cortegaça
 Esmoriz
 Maceda
 Ovar, São João, Arada e São Vicente de Pereira
 Válega

Notable people 
 Santa Camarão (1902–1968) a Portuguese boxer who was 2.02 m (6 ft 8ins) tall. 
 Luís Filipe Menezes (born 1953) a Portuguese politician.
 Miguel Bruno (born 1971) a former Portuguese professional footballer with 286 club caps
 Clarisse Cruz (born 1978) a Portuguese 3000 metres steeplechase runner, competed in the 2008 Summer Olympics
 Edgar Sá (born 1979) a Portuguese retired footballer with 510 club caps
 Roberto Reis (born 1980) a Portuguese volleyball player

References

External links

Municipality official website
Photos from Ovar
Ovar popular discussion forum

 
Municipalities of Aveiro District